Don't Bet on Women is a 1931 American pre-Code romantic comedy film directed by William K. Howard and starring Edmund Lowe, Jeanette MacDonald and Roland Young.

Plot
On a whim, Herbert Blake proposes a wager with Roger Fallon that he won't be able to get a kiss during the coming 48 hours from the next woman who happens to walk into the room. Fallon takes the bet, whereupon the woman who turns up is Herbert's wife.

Cast
 Edmund Lowe as Roger Fallon  
 Jeanette MacDonald as Jeanne Drake  
 Roland Young as Herbert Drake  
 J.M. Kerrigan as Chipley Duff  
 Una Merkel as Tallulah Hope  
 Helene Millard as Doris Brent 
 Louise Beavers as Maid  
 Sumner Getchell as Office Boy  
 Henry Kolker as Butterfield  
 James T. Mack as Sommers - Fallon's Butler  
 Cyril Ring as Jeanne's Dancing Partner

References

Bibliography
 Turk, Edward Baron. Hollywood Diva: A Biography of Jeanette MacDonald. University of California Press, 1998.

External links
 

1931 films
1931 romantic comedy films
American romantic comedy films
Films directed by William K. Howard
American black-and-white films
Fox Film films
1930s English-language films
1930s American films
Silent romantic comedy films